Walterboro Library Society Building is a historic library building located at Walterboro, Colleton County, South Carolina. It was built in 1820, and is a small, white, Federal style frame building with a side-gabled roof. The front façade features a Palladian-style door surround capped by a fanlight. The building is occupied by the Colleton County Historical Society. When Walterboro was incorporated in 1826, the town boundaries were established as "3/4 of a mile in every direction from the Walterboro Library."

It was listed in the National Register of Historic Places in 1971.  It is located in the Walterboro Historic District.

References

External links
Colleton County Historical and Preservation Society website

Historic American Buildings Survey in South Carolina
Libraries on the National Register of Historic Places in South Carolina
Federal architecture in South Carolina
Library buildings completed in 1820
Buildings and structures in Colleton County, South Carolina
National Register of Historic Places in Colleton County, South Carolina
Historic district contributing properties in South Carolina